Mike Motschenbacher is an American politician. He is the member-elect for the 47th district of the North Dakota House of Representatives.

Life and career 
Motschenbacher was executive director of the North Dakota Gaming Alliance. He was also president of the North Dakota Hospitality Association.

In 2022, Motschenbacher was elected to represent the 47th district of the North Dakota House of Representatives, succeeding Robb Eckert. He assumes office in 2023.

References 

Living people
Year of birth missing (living people)
Place of birth missing (living people)
Republican Party members of the North Dakota House of Representatives
21st-century American politicians